Michael Noble may refer to:

 Michael Noble (Parliamentarian) (1591–1649), English Member of Parliament for Lichfield in the Long Parliament
 Michael Noble, Baron Glenkinglas (1913–1984), Scottish Conservative politician, Member of Parliament 1958–1974
 Michael Noble (Labour politician) (1935–1983), English Labour Member of Parliament for Rossendale 1974–1979
 Mike Noble, British comic artist and illustrator

See also
 Michael Nobel (born 1940), Swedish humanitarian